The Wieliczka Salt Mine is a salt mine in the town of Wieliczka, near Kraków in southern Poland.

From Neolithic times, sodium chloride (table salt) was produced there from the upwelling brine. The Wieliczka salt mine, excavated from the 13th century, produced table salt continuously until 2007, as one of the world's oldest operating salt mines. Throughout its history, the royal salt mine was operated by the Żupy Krakowskie (Kraków Salt Mines) company.

Due to falling salt prices and mine flooding, commercial salt mining was discontinued in 1996.

The Wieliczka Salt Mine is now an official Polish Historic Monument (Pomnik Historii) and a UNESCO World Heritage Site. Its attractions include the shafts and labyrinthine passageways, displays of historic salt-mining technology, an underground lake, four chapels and numerous statues carved by miners out of the rock salt, and more recent sculptures by contemporary artists.

History

The rock salt is naturally of varying shades of grey, resembling unpolished granite rather than the white crystalline substance that might be expected.

Since the 13th century, brine welling up to the surface had been collected and processed for its sodium chloride (table-salt) content. In this period, wells began to be sunk, and the first shafts to be dug to extract the rock salt. From the late 13th to the early 14th century, the Saltworks Castle was built. Wieliczka is now home to the Kraków Saltworks Museum.

King Casimir III the Great (reigned 13331370) contributed greatly to the development of the Wieliczka Salt Mine, granting it many privileges and taking the miners under his care. In 1363 he founded a hospital near the salt mine. It is said that he turned a Poland of wood into a Poland of stone due to the great amount of wood from the neighbouring forests used as scaffolding and supports.

Over the period of the mine's operation, many chambers were dug and various technologies were added, such as the Hungarian horse treadmill and the Saxon treadmill for hauling salt to the surface. During World War II, the mine was used by the occupying Germans as an underground facility for war-related manufacturing.

The mine features an underground lake, exhibits on the history of salt mining, and a 3.5-kilometre (2.2-mile) visitors' route (less than 2 percent of the mine passages' total length) including statues carved from the rock salt at various times.

In 1978 the Wieliczka Salt Mine was placed on the original UNESCO list of World Heritage Sites. The mine was on the List of World Heritage in Danger from 1989 to 1998.  This was due to the threat of serious damage being done to the sculptures from humidity caused by artificial ventilation introducted in the later 19th century.

A legend about Princess Kinga, associated with the Wieliczka mine, tells of a Hungarian princess about to be married to Bolesław V the Chaste, the Prince of Kraków. As part of her dowry, she asked her father, Béla IV of Hungary, for a lump of salt, since salt was prizeworthy in Poland. Her father King Béla took her to a salt mine in Máramaros. She threw her engagement ring from Bolesław in one of the shafts before leaving for Poland. On arriving in Kraków, she asked the miners to dig a deep pit until they come upon a rock. The people found a lump of salt in there and when they split it in two, discovered the princess's ring. Kinga had thus become the patron saint of salt miners in and around the Polish capital.

During the Nazi occupation, several thousand Jews were transported from the forced labour camps in Plaszow and Mielec to the Wieliczka mine to work in the underground armament factory set up by the Germans in March and April 1944. The forced labour camp of the mine was established in St. Kinga Park and had about 1,700 prisoners. However, manufacturing never began as the Soviet offensive was nearing. Some of the machines and equipment were disassembled, including an electrical hoisting machine from the Regis Shaft, and transported to Liebenau in the Sudetes mountains. Part of the equipment was returned after the war, in autumn 1945. The Jews were transported to factories in Litomierzyce (Czech Republic) and Linz (Austria).

The mine is one of Poland's official national Historic Monuments (Pomniki historii), as designated in the first round, 16 September 1994. Its listing is maintained by the National Heritage Board of Poland.
In 2010 it was successfully proposed that the nearby historic Bochnia Salt Mine (Poland's oldest salt mine) be added to the list of UNESCO World Heritage sites. The two sister salt mines now appear together in the UNESCO list of World Heritage Sites as the "Wieliczka and Bochnia Royal Salt Mines". In 2013 the UNESCO World Heritage Site was expanded by the addition of the Żupny Castle.

Tourism
The mine is currently one of Poland's official national Historic Monuments (Pomniki historii), whose attractions include dozens of statues and four chapels carved out of the rock salt by the miners. The older sculptures have been supplemented with new carvings made by contemporary artists.  About 1.2 million people visit the Wieliczka Salt Mine annually.

Notable visitors to this site have included Nicolaus Copernicus, Johann Wolfgang von Goethe, Alexander von Humboldt, Fryderyk Chopin, Dmitri Mendeleyev, Bolesław Prus, Ignacy Paderewski, Robert Baden-Powell, Jacob Bronowski (who filmed segments of The Ascent of Man in the mine), the von Unrug family (a prominent Polish-German royal family), Karol Wojtyła (later, Pope John Paul II), former U.S. President Bill Clinton, and many others.

There is a chapel, and a reception room that is used for private functions, including weddings. A chamber has walls carved by miners to resemble wood, as in wooden churches built in early centuries. A wooden staircase provides access to the mine's 64-metre (210-foot) level. A 3-kilometre (1.9-mile) tour features corridors, chapels, statues, and underground lake,  underground. An elevator (lift) returns visitors to the surface; the elevator holds 36 persons (nine per car) and takes about 30 seconds to make the trip.

In culture
The earliest writings about the Wieliczka Salt Mine include a description by Adam Schröter: Salinarum Vieliciensium incunda ac vera descriptio. Carmine elegiaco... (1553); augmented edition, Regni Poloniae Salinarum Vieliciensium descriptio. Carmine elegiaco... (1564).

The Polish journalist and novelist Bolesław Prus described his 1878 visit to the salt mine in a remarkable series of three articles, "Kartki z podróży (Wieliczka)" ["Travel Notes (Wieliczka)"], in Kurier Warszawski (The Warsaw Courier), 1878, nos. 36–38. The great Prus scholar Zygmunt Szweykowski writes: "The power of the Labyrinth scenes [in Prus' 1895 historical novel, Pharaoh] stems, among other things, from the fact that they echo Prus' own experiences when visiting Wieliczka." The Wieliczka Salt Mine indeed helped inspire Pharaoh. Prus combined his powerful impressions of the salt mine with the description of the ancient Egyptian Labyrinth, in Book II of Herodotus' Histories, to produce the remarkable scenes found in chapters 56 and 63 of his novel.

In 1995, Preisner's Music, a compilation of film music by Polish composer Zbigniew Preisner, was recorded by Sinfonia Varsovia in the Wieliczka mine's chapel. The chapel is often said to have the best acoustics in Europe.

in 1999 in the US the mine was featured in a Modern Marvels episode on salt mines.

In the Australia television series Spellbinder: Land of the Dragon Lord, the mines were used as the Land of the Moloch.

The mine has appeared on multiple editions of the reality show The Amazing Race including Velyki Perehony, HaMerotz LaMillion 2, The Amazing Race Australia 1, and The Amazing Race 27.

Virtual tour

Sister caves
 Frasassi Caves (Genga – Marche, Italy)

See also
 Pharaoh: the Wieliczka Salt Mine inspired scenes in the historical novel by Bolesław Prus
 Bochnia Salt Mine, in southern Poland
 Chełm Chalk Tunnels, in Poland
 Kłodawa Salt Mine, in central Poland
 Khewra Salt Mine, in Punjab, Pakistan
 Salt Cathedral of Zipaquirá, Colombia
 Frasassi Caves, Italy
 Grand Roc, France
 Kartchner Caverns State Park, United States

Notes

References
 Jerzy Grzesiowski, Wieliczka: kopalnia, muzeum, zamek (Wieliczka: the Mine, the Museum, the Castle), 2nd ed., updated and augmented, Warsaw, Sport i Turystyka, 1987, .
 Christopher Kasparek, "Prus' Pharaoh and the Wieliczka Salt Mine," The Polish Review, 1997, no. 3, pp. 349–55.
 Christopher Kasparek, "Prus' Pharaoh: the Creation of a Historical Novel", The Polish Review, vol. XXXIX, no. 1, 1994, pp. 45–50.
 Bolesław Prus, Wczoraj–dziś–jutro: wybór felietonów (Yesterday–Today–Tomorrow: a Selection of Newspaper Columns, selected, edited, and with foreword and notes, by Zygmunt Szweykowski), Warsaw, Państwowy Instytut Wydawniczy, 1973, pp. 34–49.
 Zygmunt Szweykowski, Twórczość Bolesława Prusa (The Creative Writing of Bolesław Prus), second edition, Warsaw, Państwowy Instytut Wydawniczy, 1972.
 Marek Żukow-Karczewski, Pięknem urzeczeni (trzy zapomniane relacje) / Enchanted by beauty (three forgotten relations), "Aura" - A Monthly for the Protection and Shaping of Human Environment, no. 1, 1998, pp. 17–19.

External links

 Wieliczka Salt Mine – Official Website
 Wieliczka The salt of the Earth/
 Video tour of mine 
 Cracow Salt-Works Museum in Wieliczka (plan of mine) 
 Wieliczka Salt Mine near Kraków in Poland
 Wieliczka Salt Mine Tour
 Air Pollution Intrusion into the Wieliczka Salt Mine
 "A Piece of Salt that Weighs 200 Tons" fallen from Wieliczka chamber roof in 1916; Popular Science monthly, Feb 1916, p. 179. Scanned by Google Books.
 Photo story of the Wieliczka Salt Mine

Buildings and structures in Lesser Poland Voivodeship
13th-century establishments in Poland
1996 disestablishments in Poland
Salt mines in Poland
Underground mines in Poland
Tourist attractions in Poland
Museums in Lesser Poland Voivodeship
Mining museums in Poland
Salt museums
Wieliczka County
Registered museums in Poland
World Heritage Sites in Poland
World Heritage Sites in Danger